William Maze (born February 9, 1956) is a former professional tennis player from the United States.

Maze enjoyed most of his tennis success while playing doubles.  During his career he won two doubles titles, both times partnering John McEnroe.  He achieved a career-high doubles ranking of world No. 87 in 1983.

Career finals

Doubles (2 titles)

External links
 
 

American male tennis players
Sportspeople from Bakersfield, California
Tennis people from California
1956 births
Living people